Alan Kerouedan (born 23 January 2000) is a French professional footballer who plays as a winger for  club Avranches.

Cllub career
On 3 June 2020, Kerouedan signed a professional contract with Rodez. Kerouedan made his professional debut with Rodez in a 1-0 Ligue 2 win over Grenoble on 22 August 2020.

On 10 June 2022, Kerouedan signed a pre-contract agreement to join Championnat National side Avranches on a free transfer.

References

External links
 
 

2000 births
Living people
Sportspeople from Quimper
French footballers
France youth international footballers
Association football wingers
US Concarneau players
Stade Rennais F.C. players
Rodez AF players
US Avranches players
Ligue 2 players
Championnat National players
Championnat National 2 players
Championnat National 3 players
Footballers from Brittany